Plumeria pudica is a species of the genus Plumeria (Apocynaceae), native to Panama, Colombia and Venezuela. This profuse bloomer has leaves in the shape of a cobra's hood, and its flowers are white with a yellow center.

There is a variegated leaved Plumeria pudica commonly called Golden Arrow or Gilded Spoon, also a pink flowering hybrid produced in Thailand called Sri Supakorn or Pink pudica.

Studies on latex proteins from Plumeria pudica have been studied in mice as a potential treatment for periodontitis and use as an antioxidant.

Common names
 Bridal bouquet
 White frangipani
 Fiddle leaf plumeria
 Wild plumeria
 Bonairian oleander
 Thai champa (Urdu)
 Naag (cobra) champa (Bengali)
நாவில்லா அரளி ("naavilla arali") (Tamil)

Gallery

References

External links
 Sunshine Coast Frangipani Farm - Variegated pudica
 Sunshine Coast Frangipani Farm - Pink pudica

pudica
Trees of Colombia
Trees of Panama
Trees of Venezuela